Champa Junction railway station is a biggest railway station in Janjgir–Champa district, Chhattisgarh. Its code is CPH. It serves Champa city. The station consists of five platforms. The platforms are not well sheltered. It lacks many facilities including water and sanitation. Champa railway station lies on the Tatanagar–Bilaspur section of Howrah–Nagpur–Mumbai line as well as on Gewra–Champa line which connect to Korba.

Trains 
 Raigarh–Gondia Jan Shatabdi Express
 Wainganga Superfast Express
 Valsad–Puri Superfast Express
 Hatia–Pune Biweekly Express
 Okha–Howrah Link Express
 Raigarh–H.Nizamuddin Gondwana Express
 Azad Hind Express
 Howrah–Ahmedabad Superfast Express
 Lokmanya Tilak Terminus–Bhubaneswar Superfast Express
 Porbandar–Santragachi Kavi Guru Express
 Shalimar–Bhuj Weekly Superfast Express
 Howrah Mumbai Mail
 Korba Express
 Bilaspur–Patna Weekly SF Express
 Hirakud Express
 Kalinga Utkal Express
 Puri–Jodhpur Express
 Korba–Visakhapatnam Express
 Shalimar–Lokmanya Tilak Terminus Express
 Shalimar–Udaipur City Weekly Express
 South Bihar Express
 Shivnath Express

Other areas served
Kurda
Banhindih
Madwa
Birgahni
Korba (only some trains)

References

Railway junction stations in Chhattisgarh
Railway stations in Janjgir-Champa district
Bilaspur railway division